Con il cuore fermo Sicilia is a 1965 Italian documentary film directed by Gianfranco Mingozzi. The film discusses issues on Sicily.

External links 
 

1965 films
1960s Italian-language films
Italian documentary films
Documentary films about Sicily
1965 documentary films
Films directed by Gianfranco Mingozzi
1960s Italian films